Sharla Katalin Hinskens, also known as Sharmeleon (evolved from Sharmander upon receiving 500,000 subscribers in March 2020) and Sharla in Japan, (born April 23, 1986) is a Canadian YouTuber who has been vlogging about her experiences in Japan since 2011.

Biography
Sharla, who goes only by her first name, grew up in Victoria, British Columbia. She had Dutch grandparents on one side and a Hungarian grandfather on the other side. She was brought up in a vegetarian household but did occasionally eat meat at her grandparents' house. Over her life, she had followed pescatarian and vegan diets but is currently following a flexible diet.

Her first visit to Japan was when she was 17 years old, as an exchange student between the sister cities Victoria and Morioka. She worked in Tokyo at age 19 as an English teacher, and went back to Canada in 2010. When the 2011 Tōhoku earthquake hit, she moved back to Japan, due to stress from being in Canada and far away from her friends. Around this time she started vlogging her daily life. Her videos, including topics where she discusses what she likes about Japan, were well received with foreign viewers interested in the country.

On June 18, 2018, she announced her marriage to a Korean man, who wished to remain anonymous on YouTube, who had been an alumnus of Japan university after a seven-year relationship. They moved to his native Seoul where Sharla continued to vlog about her life there although she did continue to visit Japan. On March 5, 2019, Sharla announced her separation from her husband, eventually divorcing, and her intention to move back to Japan citing difficulties in living in an environment where she did not speak enough of the language in her current mental state and Canada not being exciting enough in this stage of her life.

In September 2020, she started "Neko Neko Post", a service to sell fancy Japanese stationery, of which she herself is a fan, to overseas customers in collaboration with friends.

In August 2022 she and the English YouTuber Chris Broad announced their relationship in two separate videos on their respective channels. As of February 14th, 2023, Chris and Sharla announced their engagement, with the proposal happening at the Durdle Door limestone arch located in Dorset, England.

She has translated the films Shin Godzilla (2016) and Terra Formars (2016) for the English subtitles, and also served as a dialogue coach assistant.
Since 2018, she has collaborated with Chris Broad and participated in his series Journey Across Japan. She has also partnered with local governments and organizations to promote local specialities.

References

External links 
 
 Neko Neko Post official website

Living people
YouTube channels
Canadian YouTubers
People from Victoria, British Columbia
Canadian expatriates in Japan
1986 births